Polsat Sport Extra is a Polish television sports channel owned and operated by Polsat.

Polsat Sport Extra HD 
Polsat Sport Extra HD is a second sports channel owned by Polsat, which broadcasts in HD. This channel have the same programming schedule as Polsat Sport Extra.

Programming 
In addition to sports events transmitted on Polsat Sport, Polsat Sport Extra broadcasts include:

Football 
 Ukrainian Premier League
 Scottish Cup
Copa América
International Champions Cup

Tennis 
 Wimbledon Championships
 ATP World Tour Masters 1000

Motorsports 
 Formula One
 24 Hours of Le Mans
 Dakar Rally
 Porsche Supercup

Speedway 
 Elite League

Rugby 
 Rugby World Cup
 European Nations Cup

Badminton 
 BWF World Championships

See also
 Polsat Sport
 Polsat Sport HD
 Polsat Sport News

External links
www.polsat.pl

References

Polsat
Sports television in Poland
Television channels and stations established in 2005
Television channels in Poland